Elkhorn is an unincorporated community recognized as a local urban district in the Rural Municipality of Wallace – Woodworth within the Canadian province of Manitoba that held village status prior to January 1, 2015. It was originally incorporated as a village on January 2, 1906.

History 
The community was first settled when the Canadian Pacific Railway arrived in 1882.  In the CPR survey Elkhorn is located at mile sixty-four west of Brandon, in what was known as the Broadview subdivision.  The Post Office Department appointed John McLeod, one of the district's first settlers, to be the community's first post master and the post office opened December 1, 1883.  A board of trade was organized in April 1899 and lobbied for further settlement in the community and surrounding municipality, better infrastructure, and improvement of commerce.  It was responsible for the establishment of the first fire brigade in 1901, which became the responsibility of the Village of Elkhorn when it incorporated in 1906.  In 1948 the board was reorganized and renamed the Elkhorn and District Chamber of Commerce.

Demographics 

Education 
The first settlers in the district came from well established communities in Eastern Canada or Britain and quickly recognized the necessity of public education.  The community opened the first school February 5, 1885 as School District 366.  The population rapidly outgrew the facility and the community sold it in 1892.  The building still stands as a private residence.  A larger school built of field stone was completed in 1895 and all subsequent schools have been built on the same grounds.

The growing population continued to require more space and an even larger brick school was built in 1910.  Eventually even this new school had to split its auditorium into two classrooms and create a third additional room in the basement.  Only elementary school was taught in the building after a collegiate was opened in 1959.  Elkhorn School District 366 was absorbed into the Fort La Bosse School Division November 10, 1971.  The institution again changed appearance in 1976 when the brick school was demolished and a new elementary wing and gymnasium were added to the collegiate.

Today the school is home to approximately 170 students from Kindergarten to Grade 12.

Manitoba Antique Automobile Museum 
Established to keep an impressive private collection of antique cars in Manitoba, the Manitoba Antique Automobile Museum now houses a wide variety of artifacts and documents that are integral to the history of the community, an array of early farm machinery and implements in addition to the primary collection.

The museum owes its existence to the tireless efforts of a local farmer, Isaac Clarkson.  In 1946 he purchased and restored a 1909 Hupmobile that he had been fascinated with in his youth.  He continued to acquire and restore vehicles at his farm for the next several years.  Abhorring the idea that the collection should be split up or leave the province Clarkson and other prominent members of the community successfully petitioned the Manitoba Government to establish a museum foundation.  March 30, 1961 The Manitoba Antique Automobile Museum Foundation was established by an act of the provincial legislature.  Mr. Clarkson donated his entire collection to the foundation, which at the time numbered some 65 vehicles, 40 of which had been completely restored.  The estimated value of the collection in 1961 was $75,000 - $100,000.  The community made plans to erect a museum building as a centennial project in October 1964.  Contractors completed the building by August 1965 and it was opened to the public in the summer of 1966.  The museum was officially opened on the national centennial, July 1, 1967.

The museum is located along the south side of the Trans-Canada Highway and serves as Elkhorn's primary tourist attraction.  It is open daily from May to September.

Climate

Government 
Elkhorn is a former village now administered by the Rural Municipality of Wallace – Woodworth.

Provincial representation 
Elkhorn is represented in the Legislative Assembly of Manitoba as part of the Arthur-Virden Constituency.  The constituency was represented by Larry Maguire from 1999 until his resignation on October 18, 2013 to seek the Conservative Party of Canada nomination for the federal constituency of Brandon-Souris.  Kevin Tutthill, a former councillor and deputy mayor of the former Village of Elkhorn, sought the Progressive Conservative nomination to replace Maguire, but was defeated by insurance broker Doyle Piwniuk of Virden.  On January 28, 2014 Piwniuk won the Arthur-Virden by-election and now serves as critic for multiculturalism and literacy.

Elkhorn formed all of Voting Area 10 in the 2014 Arthur-Virden by-election with a total of 348 registered voters.

Federal representation 
Elkhorn is represented in the Canadian Parliament as part of the Brandon-Souris Constituency.  The current Member of Parliament is Merv Tweed, whom the constituents first elected in 2004.  In the 2011 federal election, the community had 309 registered voters of which 184 cast ballots.  At 59.55%, voter turnout was slightly higher than the constituency level of 57.54%, but lower than the national level of 61.1%.

Media 
The first publication in Elkhorn was a handwritten news bulletin reproduced on cyclostyle.  Founded by F. Greenstreet in 1886, the Elkhorn Breeze was applauded by the Manitoba Free Press as "a credit to that prosperous young city." In spite of such praise The Breeze had ceased publication by the end of 1887.

In 1892 the Elkhorn District Advocate began circulation as a standard print, weekly newspaper.  This venture too ceased publication after only one year.  A.E. Wilson, principal of the Washakada Industrial School, salvaged the paper and began printing the Elkhorn Advocate at the school only two months after the District Advocate released its final issue.  Aboriginal students at the school printed the paper and learned the trade as part of the Residential School System designed to assimilate aboriginals into mainstream society.  Management of the paper transferred to W.J. Thompson shortly after it began printing.

December 3, 1908 the first issue of the Elkhorn Mercury circulated in the community.  The Mercury operated in competition with the Advocate until September, 1910 when the latter permanently ceased operation.  Various owners and editors of the Mercury continued to print the paper weekly in Elkhorn until 1965, when it was absorbed by the Virden Empire-Advance.  This newspaper along with the Moosomin World-Spectator are weekly publications that now provide the majority of local media coverage for the community. Currently there are no publishing or broadcasting companies in Elkhorn.

Mayors of Elkhorn

Other Notable Persons
Mary Carter (née Munn), one of the first female judges in Saskatchewan; part of childhood spent in Elkhorn.

Travis Sanheim, Ice Hockey player for the Philadelphia Flyers.

Culture 
British Columbian indie band Said the Whale make a reference to Elkhorn in Dear Elkhorn, the opening track from their 2009 album "Islands Disappear". The song's lyrics were inspired by an incident when the band's tour van broke down near the village.

References

External links 
Official Website

1906 establishments in Manitoba
Designated places in Manitoba
Former villages in Manitoba
Local urban districts in Manitoba
Populated places disestablished in 2015
2015 disestablishments in Manitoba